Reduction of capital or capital reduction is to decrease stock of a company. During reduction of capital, sometimes the company returns a portion of the stock of a company to shareholder. A private company can reduce its capital in many different ways using new procedures for the reduction of capital under the Companies Act 2006. Before these provisions came in, a court order was required to reduce share capital

See also
Capital impairment
Capital increase (:de:Kapitalerhöhung)
Dividend

References

Corporate law
Financial capital
Equity securities